Yekaterina Vladimirovna Pashkevich (born December 19, 1972 in Moscow, Russian SSR, Soviet Union) is a Russian ice hockey forward.

On December 12, 2017 she and five other Russian hockey players were disqualified with their results at the 2014 Olympics annulled.The ban was overturned after the IOC reversed course in 2018.

International career

Pashkevich was selected for the Russia women's national ice hockey team in the 2002, 2006 and 2014 Winter Olympics. In 2002, she led the team in scoring, with three goals and two assists in five games. In 2006, she had one assist in five games, and in 2014, she played in all six games, again recording one assist.

As of 2014, Pashkevich has also appeared for Russia at five IIHF Women's World Championships. Her appearance came in 1997. She won bronze medals with the team twice, in 2001 and 2013.

Career statistics

International career
Through 2013–14 season

References

External links
Eurohockey.com Profile
Sports-Reference Profile

1972 births
Ice hockey people from Moscow
Living people
Olympic ice hockey players of Russia
Ice hockey players at the 2002 Winter Olympics
Ice hockey players at the 2006 Winter Olympics
Ice hockey players at the 2014 Winter Olympics
Doping cases in ice hockey
Russian sportspeople in doping cases
Russian women's ice hockey forwards
Connecticut Whale (PHF) players
Sportspeople banned for life